Endo International plc is an American Irish-domiciled generics and specialty branded pharmaceutical company that generated over 93% of its 2017 sales from the U.S. healthcare system.  While Endo's management, operations, and customers are almost exclusively U.S.–based, in 2013 Endo executed a corporate tax inversion to Ireland to avoid U.S. corporate taxes on their U.S. drug sales, and to avail of Ireland's corporate tax system.

History and acquisitions

Endo was created as a result of a management buyout from DuPont Merck in 1997 led by Carol Ammon.

In 2009, Endo bought Indevus Pharmaceuticals to diversify into endocrinology and oncology.  The company entered the male hypogonadism market later in 2010 with Fortesta 2% gel.  In November 2013, Endo agreed to purchase Paladin Labs Inc for about $1.6 billion to gain access to the Canadian market as well as expand into emerging markets.

Endo used the 2013 acquisition of Paladin Labs, and Canadian tax laws, to execute a corporate tax inversion to Ireland.  In July 2015, The Wall Street Journal noted Endo was using Ireland's lower tax rate to acquire U.S.–based life sciences firms and relocate them to Ireland's tax regime (i.e. they could afford to pay more to acquire U.S. competitors).

In October 2014, Endo said it would buy Auxilium Pharmaceuticals for $2.6 billion along with its testosterone replacement therapy products.

In 2015, Endo acquired the specialty generics and sterile injectables company Par Pharmaceutical for $8.05 billion.

In 2018, Endo settled over 1,200 lawsuits related to its testosterone replacement therapy, Testim, and its undisclosed side effects.

Acquisition attempts
In early 2014, Endo sought to acquire NuPathe, a speciality pharmaceutical developer, for $105 million.  However, Teva prevailed in this acquisition with a substantially higher bid.

Bankruptcy
In 2022, Endo's stock fell below $1 as the company faced restructuring of its $8 billion of debt.

On August 17, 2022 Endo International Plc filed for Chapter 11 bankruptcy protection after reaching a $6 billion deal with some of its creditors.

Opioids
Endo is one of the companies named in lawsuits by the states of Ohio, Missouri and Mississippi as responsible for the US opioid epidemic.  Its 10-K statement indicates that a majority of the company's US revenue in 2016 was derived from the sale of prescription pain killers, predominantly opioids.

On June 8, 2017, the U.S. Food and Drug Administration (FDA) released a press statement in which it announced that it requested Endo to withdraw its opioid drug, oxymorphone hydrochloride (Opana ER), from the market. Opana has been linked to outbreaks of HIV, hepatitis C and serious blood disorders. It was the first time that the FDA had "taken steps to remove a currently marketed opioid pain medication from sale due to the public health consequences of abuse."

In 2021, New York Attorney General Letitia James filed a lawsuit against Endo and several other opioid manufacturers for their alleged contribution to the opioid epidemic in New York.

See also
 Corporate tax inversions
 Ireland as a tax haven

References

Additional references 

 Form 10-K 2021:

External links

Pharmaceutical companies of Ireland
Pharmaceutical companies established in 1997
Companies that filed for Chapter 11 bankruptcy in 2022
Manufacturing companies based in Dublin (city)
Companies formerly listed on the Nasdaq
Companies formed by management buyout
Tax inversions
Generic drug manufacturers